The discography of Soulja Boy, an American rapper and producer, consists of ten studio albums, three compilation albums, 67 mixtapes, 14 extended plays (EPs), 55 singles (including 19 as a featured artist), and 38 music videos.

After releasing his first mixtape, Unsigned & Still Major: Da Album Before da Album, Soulja Boy released his major-label debut souljaboytellem.com in 2007; it included the hit single "Crank That (Soulja Boy)". The same year, he was granted his own imprint label, Stacks on Deck Entertainment. In 2008, he released his second studio album, iSouljaBoyTellem; the album produced the top ten Billboard Hot 100 single "Kiss Me Thru the Phone". In 2010, he released his third studio album, The DeAndre Way; which included the singles "Pretty Boy Swag", "Blowing Me Kisses", and "Speakers Going Hammer".

Albums

Studio albums

Compilation albums

Mixtapes

Extended plays

Singles

As lead artist

As featured artist

Promotional singles

Other charted songs

Music videos

Studio album music videos

Mixtapes music videos

Miscellaneous music videos

Guest appearances

Production discography

2007
Soulja Boy – Souljaboytellem.com
1. "Intro"
2. "Crank That (Soulja Boy)"
4. "Snap and Roll"
5. "Bapes" (featuring Arab)
6. "Let Me Get Em"
7. "Donk"
8. "Yahhh!" (featuring Arab)
 Sample credit: The Honey Drippers – "Impeach the President" 
11. "Booty Meat"
12. "Report Card" (featuring Arab)
 Sample credit: Jim Jones – "We Fly High" and Rich Boy – "Throw Some D's" 
13. "Don't Get Mad"
15. "Nope"

V.I.C. – Beast
6. "Get Silly"
19. "Get Silly" (Collipark Remix) (featuring Soulja Boy, Bun B, E-40, Unk, Polow Da Don and Jermaine Dupri)

2009
Bow Wow – New Jack City II
12. Marco Polo (featuring Soulja Boy)

Soulja Boy – iSouljaBoyTellem
2. "Bird Walk"
4. "Gucci Bandanna" (featuring Gucci Mane and Shawty Lo)
7. "Booty Got Swag (Donk Part 2)"
8. "Hey You There" 
11. "Wit My Yums On"
12. "Go Head" (featuring Juney Boomdata)

2010
Soulja Boy – The DeAndre Way
6. "30 Thousand 100 Million" (featuring Lil B and Arab)

2013
Lil Wayne – I Am Not a Human Being II
14. "Wowzers" (featuring Trina)

2014
Nicki Minaj - Non-album single
 00. "Yasss Bish" (featuring Soulja Boy)

Notes

References

Hip hop discographies
Discographies of American artists
Production discographies